Khalid bin Ali Al Humaidan (born 1955) is a Saudi intelligence officer. He is the director general of General Intelligence Directorate. He took over from the former chief Youssef bin Ali Al Idrissi in 2015.

Early life and education
Khalid bin Ali Al Humaidan was born in Ha'il, a city in the Northern region of Saudi Arabia, in 1955. He studied criminal justice at Saginaw Valley State University in the United States.

Career
Al Humaidan started his career by enrolling in the Saudi Military in 1982. He was in the army for over 20 years before he was appointed deputy head of the criminal investigation division in Saudi Arabia in 2011. After his appointment as deputy's head, he was promoted to the rank of lieutenant general. 

In January 2015, he was appointed head of intelligence through a royal decree. Al Humaidan was also made a member of Saudi Arabia's Political and Security Affairs Council. The subject maintained communications with Mohammed Abdul Salam, the chief Houthi peace negotiator after talks were chilled by the Houthi attack of January 2017 and his deputy met with Hussein al-Ezzi in Amman later in the year.

References

20th-century Saudi Arabian people
21st-century Saudi Arabian politicians
1955 births
Living people
People from Ha'il
Saudi Arabian military personnel
Saginaw Valley State University alumni